Kitty Crowther (born 4 April 1970, in Brussels) is a Belgian illustrator and writer of children's books. For her career contribution to "children's and young adult literature in the broadest sense" she won the 2010 Astrid Lindgren Memorial Award from the Swedish Arts Council, the biggest prize in children's literature.

Biography

Kitty Crowther is the Belgian daughter of a British father and a Swedish mother. She was born and grew up in Uccle, part of Brussels, in Belgium. She and her husband now live in Blanmont with their two sons. She studied Graphic Arts at the Institut Saint-Luc in Brussels. She works mainly in French, occasionally in Dutch, and has as of 2010 created some 35 books of her own, and has illustrated books of others as well, e.g. work by Carl Norac, Bart Moeyaert and Toon Tellegen.

She made her debut in 1994 with Mon royaume (My kingdom). The jury of the Gouden Griffel awarded her a "Vlag en Wimpel" in 1997 for the illustrated book Mon ami Jim.

Further recognition followed in 2003 and 2005, when she received the Silver Pencil for In het pikkedonker (In the pitch dark) and Kleine Dood en het meisje (Little Death and the girl). In 2010 she received the Astrid Lindgren Award, administered by the Swedish Arts Council. In the jury's citation she was described as "the master of line but also of atmosphere".

Works
1994: Mon royaume
1994: Chat-collection, text by Florence Dutruc-Rosset
1995: Un jour mon Prince viendra, text by Andréa Nève
1995: Va faire un tour
1996: Mon ami Jim: translated in English as Jack and Jim in 2000
1997: Copain des peintres: La Boîte à idées des artistes en herbe, text by Geneviève Casterman
1997: Lily au royaume des nuages
1998: Les animaux et leurs poètes, text by Jean-Hugues Malineau
1999: Grote Oma's, text by Bart Moeyaert
1999: La Grande Ourse, text by Carl Norac
2000: Moi et rien
2000: Trois histoires folles de Monsieur Pol
2000: 365 histoires, comptines et chansons. Le Grand Livre des petits by Marie Delafon, Kitty Crowther, Rémi Saillard, and Isabelle Chatelard
2000: Message de bonheur, pour une naissance
2000: 365 histoires pour l'année
2000: Lever de rideau, text by Sophie Dieuaide
2000: Le scoop du siècle, text by Sophie Dieuaide
2000: 'Ce rat de Custer, text by Sophie Dieuaide
2001: Le père Noël m'a écrit, text by Carl Norac
2001: Tout va très bien, madame la marquise by Paul Misraki, Henri Allum (aka Henry Laverne), Charles Pasquier, and Kitty Crowther
2001: Le Bain d’Elias2001: Champions du monde, la vie héroïque d'Antoine Lebic, text by Sophie Dieuaide
2002: De verjaardag van de eekhoorn by Toon Tellegen
2002: Scritch scratch dip clapote!2002: Teri hate tua: L'épouvantable tortue rouge!, text by Jean-François Chabas
2003: L'Enfant racine2003: La Princesse qui n’existait pas, text by Christian Oster
2004: Petits meurtres et autres tendresses2004: 365 histoires, comptines et chansons by Jacques Duquennoy, Rémi Saillard, Isabelle Chatelard, and Kitty Crowther
2004: Vingt-neuf moutons, text by Christian Oster
2005: La Visite de Petite Mort2005: Le grand désordre2005–2010: Poka et Mine: Le Réveil,  Les nouvelle ailes, Au cinéma, Au Musée, Au fond du jardin, Le football2006: Spinoza et Moi, text by Sylvaine Jaoui
2006: Copain des peintres, text by Geneviève Casterman
2006: Les contes de l'armoire: Trente-cinq contes brefs by Pierre Mosonyi, Kitty Crowther, Eva Almassy, and Fanny Volcsanszky
2006: Les contes des magasins by Aliz Mosonyi, Kitty Crowther, and Eva Almassy
2006: Pas un mot, text by Nathalie Kuperman

2007: Dans moi, text by Alex Cousseau
2007: Un nuage dans le ventre, text by Gilles Abier
2008: Alors?2009: Petits poèmes pour passer le temps by Carl Norac, Kitty Crowther, and Célestin
2009: Annie du lac2010: "Le petit homme et Dieu"
2018: Stories of the Night, 64pp.,  (Gecko Press) 
2019: The Runaways, text by Ulf Stark 136pp.,  (Gecko Press)

Awards
2006: Grand Prix triennal de littérature de jeunesse
2010: Astrid Lindgren Memorial Award

References

External links

Some examples from her work from The Guardian''

1970 births
Living people
20th-century Belgian women writers
21st-century Belgian women writers
20th-century Belgian women artists
21st-century Belgian women artists
Belgian children's writers
Belgian children's book illustrators
Belgian illustrators
Belgian women illustrators
Astrid Lindgren Memorial Award winners
Artists from Brussels
Date of birth missing (living people)
Belgian women children's writers
Boekenpauw winners